Wahid Hamed (1 July 1944 – 2 January 2021) was an Egyptian screenwriter.

Personal life 
Hamed was born in Beni Quraysh, Sharqia Governorate. He moved to Cairo in 1963 to study in the Department of Sociology at Cairo University.

He was married to Zeinab Sweidan, with whom he had his son, Marwan.

Work as a screenwriter 
According to Egypt Independent; "Hamed was concerned with Egyptian society and important issues within the country, and was able to eloquently narrate Egypt’s conditions, dreams, and history." He worked with a number of directors, including Samir Seif, Sherif Arafa and Atef El-Tayeb. He won several awards for his work. In 2020, he won the Golden Pyramid Appreciation Award from the 42nd Cairo International Film Festival for Lifetime Achievement.

Death 
Hamed died on 2 January 2021 at the age of 76 in Cairo, Egypt.

References

External links 

 

1944 births
2021 deaths
Egyptian screenwriters
People from Sharqia Governorate
Cairo University alumni